Vaughn Duggins (born July 10, 1987) is an American professional basketball player, who currently plays for s.Oliver Würzburg of the German BBL. Duggins played college basketball for the Wright State Raiders from 2006 until 2011 before turning professional.

Professional career
On July 2, 2015, Duggins signed a 2-year contract with EWE Baskets Oldenburg of the German BBL.

References

1987 births
Living people
EWE Baskets Oldenburg players
Le Mans Sarthe Basket players
SLUC Nancy Basket players
Basketball players from Fort Wayne, Indiana
s.Oliver Würzburg players
American expatriate basketball people in Germany
American expatriate basketball people in France
Shooting guards
Wright State Raiders men's basketball players
American men's basketball players